Michael Friedrich Wilhelm Krüger (born 14 December 1951 in Ulm) is a German comedian, actor and singer.

Filmography
 Piratensender Powerplay (1981)
 Die Supernasen (1983)
 Zwei Nasen tanken Super (1984)
 Seitenstechen (1985)
 Die Einsteiger (1985)
 Geld oder Leber! (1986)
 Die Senkrechtstarter (1989)
Ein Schnupfen hätte auch gereicht (2017)

External links 
 

German male comedians
German male television actors
German male film actors
1951 births
Living people
People from Ulm